William John Wheatley (July 5, 1909 – February 5, 1992) was an American basketball player who competed in the 1936 Summer Olympics. He was part of the American basketball team, which won the gold medal. He played two matches including the final. He later coached the Salt Lake City entry in American Basketball League of the AAU.

Wheatley died in his El Cerrito, California, home on February 5, 1992, at age 82.

References

External links
profile

1909 births
1992 deaths
Amateur Athletic Union men's basketball players
American men's basketball players
Basketball players at the 1936 Summer Olympics
Basketball coaches from Kansas
Basketball players from Kansas
Guards (basketball)
Kansas Wesleyan Coyotes men's basketball players
Medalists at the 1936 Summer Olympics
Olympic gold medalists for the United States in basketball
People from Saline County, Kansas
United States men's national basketball team players